Events in the year 1995 in Eritrea.

Incumbents 

 President: Isaias Afewerki

Events 

 15 – 17 December – The Hanish Islands conflict was fought between the country and Yemen over the island of Greater Hanish in the Red Sea.

Deaths

References

Sources

 
1990s in Eritrea
Years of the 20th century in Eritrea
Eritrea
Eritrea